is a Japanese professional racing cyclist. She rode at the 2015 UCI Track Cycling World Championships.

Major results
2014
3rd Omnium, Track Clubs ACC Cup
2015
3rd Scratch Race, Asian Track Championships

References

Year of birth missing (living people)
Living people
Japanese female cyclists
Place of birth missing (living people)
21st-century Japanese women